Esther A. Odekunle is a British neurobiologist and antibody engineer. Her research focuses on identifying and removing risks from antibodies to improve their development into medications. She also promotes the visibility of diverse professionals in STEM.

Early life and education 

Odekunle was born the youngest of her siblings and raised in the United Kingdom by Nigerian parents who had emigrated to the UK. She was inspired by her teachers while growing up and by books on animals and the human body, encouraging her interest in science from a young age. After initially considering a career in medicine, she earned both the B.S. in biochemistry and Ph.D. in neurobiology from Queen Mary University of London. Her doctoral work focused on neuropeptide systems in starfish. She chose to work on starfish because of little-understood abilities such as regeneration. After having worked with mice and rats as an undergraduate, she was also encouraged by the fact that starfish do not bite. She took a year off between degree programs and received full funding for her doctoral work from the Society for Experimental Biology.

Career 

Odekunle's goal in academia was not to remain there as a professor, but rather to "explore a specific scientific area in great depth and contribute to the scientific field" and eventually to apply her scientific skills to therapeutics. As an antibody engineer, she works to clone antibodies from B cells and develop them as potential treatments for specific disease targets such as cancers, viral infections, and bacterial infections. Because of the limitations placed on what scientists in her position in the pharmaceutical industry can say about their work, Odekunle had to develop a voice within the scientific community apart from speaking about things that are confidential. This led her to speaking out on racism in academia and science and to helping to encourage and make more visible those in science who are underrepresented. This she does on various social media platforms. Some of her content, such as her episode on Henrietta Lacks on her YouTube channel has been shared with students at early as well as advanced levels of education.

In 2021, Odekunle was selected as a Rising Star Finalist in the Black British Business Awards' STEM category.

Publications

References

External links 
 Stem Uncovered with Dr. Esther

British women scientists
Scientists from London
Women molecular biologists
Women pharmacologists
Black British women
British women neuroscientists
British neuroscientists
African diaspora in the United Kingdom
Science communicators
Year of birth missing (living people)
Living people
Yoruba women scientists
British people of Nigerian descent
English people of Yoruba descent
English people of Nigerian descent
Alumni of Queen Mary University of London